Joseph Clark Painter (September 14, 1840 – November 17, 1911) was an American politician in the state of Washington. He served in the Washington House of Representatives from 1889 to 1893.

References

Republican Party members of the Washington House of Representatives
1840 births
1911 deaths
19th-century American politicians